Gomti Ke Kinare is a 1972 Bollywood drama film, directed by Saawan Kumar Tak in his directorial debut. The film stars Meena Kumari and Mumtaz. It was the last release of Meena Kumari, and was released posthumously on 22 November 1972, 8 months after her death on 31 March. 

She shot the film through her failing health in 1971, and was apprehensive whether she would be able to complete the filming. Eventually, she did with the last schedule on 29 December 1971.  However, despite the music score by R.D. Burman, the film failed at the box office.

Amitabh Bachchan was being considered (to play the hero, opposite Mumtaz) by Saawan Kumar and Meena Kumari. However, Mumtaz, who was close to the Khan brothers at the time, recommended Sameer Khan instead.

Plot
Sameer lives a poor lifestyle in Bombay with his mother, Ganga, and maternal uncle, Nekiram. Nekiram works at a petrol pump, and his mother paints pictures and statuettes of Hindu deities. Sameer grows up, becomes an engineer, and lands a job with Khosla Enterprises, which is run by Chairman Gopaldas Khosla, where he proves his abilities and is soon promoted as Chief Engineer, and gets a bungalow to live in as well as a fancy car. He meets with Roshni, the daughter of Gopaldas; they fall in love, and soon get engaged. His idyllic lifestyle is shattered when a rival businessman, Chaganmal, alleges that Sameer's mother was actually Gangabai, a Lucknow-based courtesan, who was never married, and that Nekiram is not his maternal uncle.

Cast
Meena Kumari as  Ganga
Agha as Nekiram 
Jalal Agha as Dhobi 
Sameer Khan as  Sameer "Munna"
Harbans Darshan M. Arora as  Doctor 
Chandrima Bhaduri as Shyama's Mother 
Bharat Bhushan as  Bharat 
Rajan Haksar as  Khan 
Helen as herself 
Daisy Irani as Chandni 
I. S. Johar as  Seth Chellamal 
Alankar Joshi as  Young Sameer "Munna" (as Master Alankar) 
Lalita Kumari as  Champa (as Lalita Sinha) 
Manorama as  Manoramabai 
Mukri as  Himself 
Mumtaz as  Roshni Das 
Paintal as  Film Kumar 
Randhir as  Ramu 
Rehman as  Gopal Das 
Asit Sen as  Petrol Pump owner 
Shyama as  Mrs. Shyama Das 
Tun Tun as  Petrol Pump owner's wife

Soundtrack
"Jeene Ka Din" - Kishore Kumar and Lata Mangeshkar
"Aao Aao Jaane Jahan" - Kishore Kumar and Asha Bhosle
"Jackpot Lag Gaya" - Manna Dey and Asha Bhosle
"Aaj To Meri Hasi Udai" - Lata Mangeshkar
"Khwab Ki Tasveer" - Manhar Udhas

References

External links
 
 

1972 films
1970s Hindi-language films
1972 drama films
Films set in Mumbai
Films set in Uttar Pradesh
Films scored by R. D. Burman
1972 directorial debut films
Films directed by Saawan Kumar Tak